Kyle Edward Weiland (born September 12, 1986) is an American former professional baseball pitcher. He played in Major League Baseball (MLB) for the Boston Red Sox and Houston Astros.

Career
Weiland attended the University of Notre Dame, where he played for the Notre Dame Fighting Irish baseball team. In 2007, he played collegiate summer baseball with the Falmouth Commodores of the Cape Cod Baseball League. He was drafted by the Red Sox in the 3rd round of the 2008 Major League Baseball draft.

He made his Major League debut on July 10, 2011 against the Baltimore Orioles.  He started and pitched 4+ innings, before being ejected for hitting Vladimir Guerrero with no outs in the 5th.  In his debut, he made several Red Sox firsts, namely: first New Mexico native to play with the Red Sox; first Red Sox player to wear #70 in a game and the first Red Sox player to be ejected in his first major league game. On December 14, 2011, he was traded to the Houston Astros along with Jed Lowrie for Mark Melancon He earned a spot in the Astros' starting rotation at the beginning of the 2012 season. Weiland was diagnosed with a right shoulder infection and was shut down for the rest of the 2012 season.

He missed the whole 2013 season because of injury. In February, 2014, Weiland attempted to pitch again at any level after battling an infection in his shoulder and abdomen.

He announced his retirement on March 29, 2015.

Scouting Report
Weiland throws 4 pitches: a two-seam and four seam fastball, a curveball and a cutter.

References

External links

1986 births
Living people
Boston Red Sox players
Houston Astros players
Lowell Spinners players
Salem Red Sox players
Portland Sea Dogs players
Pawtucket Red Sox players
Baseball players from Albuquerque, New Mexico
Major League Baseball pitchers
Notre Dame Fighting Irish baseball players
Falmouth Commodores players